Richland Township is one of eleven townships in Benton County, Indiana. As of the 2020 census, its population was 562 and it contained 258 housing units. Its name is a "reference to the rich land within its borders."

Geography

Cities and towns
 Earl Park

Adjacent townships
 Center (southeast)
 Parish Grove (southwest)
 Union (east)
 York (west)
 Grant Township, Newton County (northeast)
 Jefferson Township, Newton County (northwest)

Major highways
  U.S. Route 41
  U.S. Route 52

Cemeteries
The township contains three cemeteries: Dehner, Earl Park and Saint John.

References

Citations

Sources
 United States Census Bureau cartographic boundary files
 U.S. Board on Geographic Names

External links

 Indiana Township Association
 United Township Association of Indiana

Townships in Benton County, Indiana
Lafayette metropolitan area, Indiana
Townships in Indiana
Populated places established in 1868
1868 establishments in Indiana